Sharon G. Kujawa is a clinical audiologist, Director of Audiology Research at the Massachusetts Eye and Ear Infirmary, Associate Professor of Otology and Laryngology at Harvard Medical School, and Adjunct Faculty of Harvard-MIT Health Sciences and Technology.and specialist in otolaryngology, Her specialty is the effects of noise exposure and aging on auditory function.

Biography 
Kujawa completed a BS from Michigan State University, a MS from Idaho State University, and a PhD from the University of Arizona in 1993. She completed two post-doctoral fellowships, the first in auditory pharmacology at Kresge Institute of Louisiana State University Medical Center, and the second in auditory neurophysiology in the Eaton-Peabody Laboratory at Harvard University. She was director of audiology at the University of Washington before joining the faculty of Harvard Medical School.

Kujawa has served on the executive board of the American Academy of Audiology and as chair of their research committee. She has also served on the board of directors of the American Auditory Society and as an editorial board member and section editor of the journal Ear and Hearing. She has served as a member of the Scientific Review Council for the Deafness Research Foundation and on the working group on translational research for the National Institute on Deafness and other Communication Disorders.

Research 
Kujawa's research program aims to find out aging and noise exposure alter inner ear structures and functions, how genetic factors affect vulnerability to hearing loss, and how neural processes can be manipulated for purposes of treatment or prevention.  Noise-induced and age-related hearing loss are the most common forms of hearing loss seen in adult patients and they often co-exist in the same patients. In collaboration with M. Charles Liberman and other researchers, Kujawa has examined the vulnerability of the synapses that connect hair cells in the cochlea to auditory nerve fibers.  Their research has shown that cochlear synapses may be temporarily or permanently damaged from overexposure to intense sound.

Honors 

In 2017, Kujawa received the biennial Callier Prize in Communication Disorders  awarded by the Callier Center for Communication Disorders at the University of Texas at Dallas,  for her research on hidden sensorineural hearing loss, characterized as difficulties hearing in noisy listening environments.

In 2010, Kujawa was awarded the Distinguished Achievement Award from the American Academy of Audiology for research "exploring mechanisms related to compromise in normal auditory function from noise exposure and how noise can alter the aging of the inner ear and neural systems."

In 2003, she received the Distinguished Alumnus Award in Speech and Hearing by the University of Arizona.

Representative Publications

References

External links 

Harvard Faculty Homepage
Massachusetts Eye and Ear Faculty Homepage
American Academy of Audiology Profile

Living people
American women scientists
Michigan State University alumni
University of Arizona alumni
Harvard University faculty
Year of birth missing (living people)
Audiologists
American women academics
21st-century American women